The 1976 Moro Gulf earthquake and tsunami took place on  near the islands of Mindanao and Sulu, in the Philippines. Its magnitude was calculated as being as high as 8.0 on the moment magnitude scale.

It was the deadliest and strongest earthquake in the Philippines in 58 years since the 1918 Celebes Sea earthquake.

Tectonic summary

Several fault zones in the region are capable of producing major earthquakes and destructive local tsunamis. The two major fault zones that are most dangerous are the Sulu Trench in the Sulu Sea and the Cotabato Trench, a region of subduction that crosses the Celebes Sea and the Moro Gulf in Southern Mindanao. According to the PHIVOLCS historical catalog of earthquakes for the last 100 years, this region of the southern Philippines is characterized by moderate to high seismicity. The most recent earthquake along the Cotabato Trench region of subduction being the March 6, 2002, earthquake in Southern Mindanao.

Intensity Report

Effects

The initial earthquake was widespread and was felt as far as the central Philippine islands of the Visayas. A massive tsunami devastated 700 kilometers of coastline bordering the Moro Gulf in the North Celebes Sea, resulting in destruction and death in the coastal communities of the Sulu Archipelago, southern Mindanao particularly the provinces of Sultan Kudarat and Sarangani (formerly part of South Cotabato), and in the Zamboanga Peninsula including Zamboanga City and Pagadian City.

The maximum height of the waves reached 9 meters at Lebak on the isla; 4.3 meters at Alicia; 3 meters at Resa Bay on the eastern coast of Basilan; and at the islands of Jolo and Sacol.  At least 5,000 people died during the earthquake and tsunami, with thousands more remaining missing. Some reports say that as many as 8,000 people lost their lives in total, with ninety percent of all deaths the result of the following tsunami.

Initially over 8,000 people were officially counted as killed or missing, 10,000 injured, and 90,000 homeless, making it one of the most devastating disasters in the history of the Philippine Islands. After the initial earthquake the people were unaware of the need to move to higher ground; when the tsunami hit it sucked most of the victims out to sea. Based on the investigation on the affected region it was confirmed that the waves reached up to  when they hit the areas. There were reports of weak tsunami activity as far as Japan.

In Zamboanga City, 14 buildings were partially damaged. Zamboanga City was spared from serious damage of the tsunami triggered by this earthquake because the Basilan Island and the Santa Cruz Islands served as a buffer and deflected waves.

See also
List of earthquakes in 1976
List of earthquakes in the Philippines

References

External links
 Philippines Institute of Volcanology and Seismology  
 The Earthquake and Tsunami of August 16, 1976, in the Philippines – The Moro Gulf Tsunami" – George Pararas-Carayannis
 

1976 Moro
1976 in the Philippines
1976 earthquakes
Moro
History of Zamboanga del Sur
History of Maguindanao del Norte
History of Maguindanao del Sur
1976 disasters in the Philippines